6537 Adamovich, provisional designation , is a stony Florian asteroid from the inner regions of the asteroid belt, approximately 4 kilometers in diameter.

It was discovered on 19 August 1979, by Soviet–Russian astronomer Nikolai Chernykh at the Crimean Astrophysical Observatory, Nauchnyj, on the Crimean peninsula. The asteroid was later named after Byelorussian writer Aleksandr Adamovich.

Orbit and classification 

Adamovich is a S-type asteroid a member of the Flora family, one of the largest groups of stony asteroids in the main-belt. It orbits the Sun in the inner main-belt at a distance of 1.8–2.6 AU once every 3 years and 3 months (1,175 days). Its orbit has an eccentricity of 0.20 and an inclination of 4° with respect to the ecliptic.

Physical characteristics

Lightcurve photometry 

A fragmentary rotational lightcurve of Adamovich was obtained from photometric observation made at the Palomar Transient Factory in California in February 2013. It showed a provisional rotation period of  hours with a brightness amplitude of 0.13 magnitude.

Diameter and albedo 

According to the surveys carried out by the NEOWISE mission of NASA's Wide-field Infrared Survey Explorer, Adamovich measures 3.22 and 4.3 kilometers in diameter and its surface has an albedo of 0.17 and 0.50, respectively. The Collaborative Asteroid Lightcurve Link (CALL) assumes an albedo of 0.24 – derived from 8 Flora, the largest member and namesake of its orbital family – and calculates a diameter of 4.5 kilometers with an absolute magnitude of 13.9.

Naming 

This minor planet was named in memory of Byelorussian–Russian Aleksandr Mikhajlovich Adamovich (1927–1994), publicist, literary scholar and talented writer, known for his civic responsibility. The official naming citation was published on 4 May 1999.

References

External links 
 Asteroid Lightcurve Database (LCDB), query form (info )
 Dictionary of Minor Planet Names, Google books
 Asteroids and comets rotation curves, CdR – Observatoire de Genève, Raoul Behrend
 Discovery Circumstances: Numbered Minor Planets (5001)-(10000) – Minor Planet Center
 
 

006537
Discoveries by Nikolai Chernykh
Named minor planets
19790819